Tilden is an unincorporated community located in Itawamba County, Mississippi.

History
Tilden is one of the oldest communities of Itawamba County. Tilden was first settled in the 1830s by settlers from North Carolina. A post office operated under the name Tilden from 1884 to 1903.

References

Unincorporated communities in Itawamba County, Mississippi
Unincorporated communities in Mississippi